José Luis Sampedro Sáez (Barcelona, 1 February 1917 – Madrid, 8 April 2013) was a Spanish economist and writer who advocated an economy "more humane, more caring, able to help develop the dignity of peoples".
Academician of the Real Academia Española since 1990, he was the recipient of the Order of Arts and Letters of Spain, the Menéndez Pelayo International Prize (2010) and the Spanish Literature National Prize (2011). He became an inspiration for the anti-austerity movement in Spain.

Biography
In 1917, the year of his birth, his family moved to Tangier (Morocco), where he lived until aged thirteen. In 1936 he was mobilized by the Republican faction  in the Spanish Civil War, fighting in an anarchist battalion.  He spent the war serving variously in Catalonia, Guadalajara, Castilla-La Mancha and Huete (Cuenca). After the war, he was again called up and served in the garrison of the Spanish enclave of Melilla in North Africa.

After the war he obtained work as a customs officer in Santander before moving to Madrid, where, in 1944 he married Elizabeth Pellicer before completing his university studies in Economics in 1947, winning, in the process, the award of an "Extraordinary Prize".

Thereafter he started working with a major Spanish financial institution at that moment, the Banco Exterior de España whilst also teaching at the university. In 1955 he became the professor of Economic policy at the Complutense University of Madrid, which post he held until 1969, combining teaching with various positions in the Banco Exterior de España, where he reached the post of deputy general manager. Meanwhile, he published academic works about the post economic reality and structural analysis and the European future of Spain and also wrote his first theatrical play A place to live (1955).

Around 1965 and 1966 there was a purge of prominent university professors in Spain including the philosopher :es:José Luis López Aranguren  and socialist lawyer Enrique Tierno Galván, as a result of which he decided to become a visiting professor at the Universities of Salford and Liverpool in North West England.

Along with other teachers, Sampedro created the Spanish Center for Studies and Research (CEISA), a symbol of intellectual independence which would be closed in Francoist Spain three years later. In 1968 he was appointed as Anna Howard Shaw lecturer at Bryn Mawr College for women in Philadelphia USA

On his return to Spain he requested a leave of absence from Complutense University and published a satirical play called the naked horse. After the death of Francisco Franco In 1976 he returned to the Banco Exterior de España as a consultant economist. In 1977 he was appointed senator by Royal prerogative of King Juan Carlos, then, following the first democratic Spanish general election, 1977 he was elected as a socialist senator a post he held until 1979.

In parallel to his professional activity as an economist, he published several novels and continued to write after his official retirement, achieving great successes with works like October, October, Etruscan smile or Old siren. Sadly, his literary successes coincided with the tragic news of the death of his wife, Isabel Pellicer, in 1986.

In 1990 he was appointed member of the Royal Spanish Academy, the definitive authority on the Castilian Spanish where his heterodox inaugural address, From the border  related to the subject of his novel The old siren, published that same year, which can be considered a Spanish hymn to life, love and tolerance.

In 2003 the widowed Sampedro was remarried to the writer, poet and translator :es:Olga Lucas in  the spa town of Alhama de Aragón.  Thereafter he spent part of the year on  Tenerife, in the Canary Islands a place of myths whose symbols, the Dracaena draco tree, is supposedly home to the Tenerife blue chaffinch of the volcanic peak of  Mount Teide which inspired him to write The path of the dragon tree.

He exercised his critical humanism about what he viewed as the moral and social disruption arising from Western style Neoliberalism and Capitalism. In reference to this, he added his grain of sand to the Anti-austerity movement in Spain during May 2011 by writing the preface to the Spanish edition of the book  Time for Outrage by the French diplomat Stéphane Hessel.

Sampedro died on April 8, 2013, in Madrid, aged 96 years old.

Awards
In 2002 Sampedro was appointed honorary non-executive chairman of the Spanish telecommunications company Sintratel, along with Nobel prizewinner José Saramago. Sintratel is a skit on sin trabajo telecoms or telecommunications workers without work.

In 2008, he was awarded the Medal of the Order of Charlemagne by  the Principality of Andorra. In April 2009 he was invested as Doctor Honoris Causa of the University of Seville.

In 2010 was awarded the XXIV Menéndez Pelayo International Prize for his "many contributions to human thought" as, variously, an economist, writer and teacher. Additionally, the Spanish Council of Ministers  awarded Sampedro the Order of Arts and Letters of Spain on 2 November 2010  for "his outstanding literary career and his thought committed to the problems of his time". In 2011, he received the Premio Nacional de las Letras Españolas.

On May 24, 2012 was invested Doctor Honoris Causa by the University of Alcalá near Madrid.

Aranjuez
 
In his novel Royal Site, Sampedro takes a tour of the Royal Palace of Aranjuez and its gardens.   echoing the sentiments o the geographer :es:Thomas Lopez. That Aranjuez is the real and true center of Spain. Aranjuez is also the final terminal of a route followed by timber rafters floating timber to the sawmills along the Rio Tajo in the novel A river that leads.

His is celebrated locally in the José Sampedro Centro de Educación de Adultos and a conference room of the municipal cultural center.

Works

About economy
Principios prácticos de localización industrial (1957)
Realidad económica y análisis estructural (1959)
Las fuerzas económicas de nuestro tiempo (1967)
Conciencia del subdesarrollo (1973)
Inflación: una versión completa (1976)
El mercado y la globalización (2002)
Los mongoles en Bagdad (2003)
Sobre política, mercado y convivencia (2006)
Economía humanista. Algo más que cifras (2009)
El mercado y nosotros

Novels
La estatua de Adolfo Espejo (1939) -unpublished 1994–
La sombra de los días (1947) -unpublished 1994–
Congreso en Estocolmo (1952)
El río que nos lleva (1961)
El caballo desnudo (1970)
Octubre, octubre (1981)
La sonrisa etrusca (1985)
La vieja sirena (1990)
Real Sitio (1993)
El amante lesbiano (2000)
La senda del drago (2006)
Cuarteto para un solista (2011) -collaboration with Olga Lucas-

Tales
Mar al fondo (1992)
Mientras la tierra gira (1993)

Other works
Escribir es vivir (2005) -autobiography written with Olga Lucas-
La escritura necesaria (2006) -essay-dialogue on his novels and his life. 
La ciencia y la vida (2008) -dialogue next to the cardiologist Valentin Fuster ordered by Olga Lucas-
Reacciona (2011)

See also
Time for Outrage!

References

External links

Fallece José Luis Sampedro a los 96 años
Official website
El Periscopio – Rosa María Artal
Producción de rtve que con el título de El río que nos lleva es un documental autobiográfico, presentado por el propio José Luis Sampedro.
Entrevista a José Luis Sampedro
.

1917 births
2013 deaths
Spanish economists
Spanish male writers